In enzymology, a 3-oxosteroid 1-dehydrogenase is an enzyme that catalyzes the chemical reaction

a 3-oxosteroid + acceptor  a 3-oxo-Delta1-steroid + reduced acceptor

Thus, the two substrates of this enzyme are 3-oxosteroid and acceptor, whereas its two products are 3-oxo-Delta1-steroid and reduced acceptor.

This enzyme belongs to the family of oxidoreductases, specifically those acting on the CH-CH group of donor with other acceptors.  The systematic name of this enzyme class is 3-oxosteroid:acceptor Delta1-oxidoreductase. Other names in common use include 3-oxosteroid Delta1-dehydrogenase, Delta1-dehydrogenase, 3-ketosteroid-1-en-dehydrogenase, 3-ketosteroid-Delta1-dehydrogenase, 1-ene-dehydrogenase, 3-oxosteroid:(2,6-dichlorphenolindophenol) Delta1-oxidoreductase, 4-en-3-oxosteroid:(acceptor)-1-en-oxido-reductase, Delta1-steroid reductase, and 3-oxosteroid:(acceptor) Delta1-oxidoreductase.

References

 

EC 1.3.99
Enzymes of unknown structure